Robert Bernard Reich (born June 24, 1946) is an American professor, author, lawyer, and political commentator. He worked in the administrations of Presidents Gerald Ford and Jimmy Carter, and served as Secretary of Labor from 1993 to 1997 in the cabinet of President Bill Clinton. He was also a member of President Barack Obama's economic transition advisory board.

Reich has been the Chancellor's Professor of Public Policy at the Goldman School of Public Policy at UC Berkeley since January 2006. He was formerly a Lecturer at Harvard University's John F. Kennedy School of Government and a professor of social and economic policy at the Heller School for Social Policy and Management of Brandeis University. He has also been a contributing editor of The New Republic, The American Prospect (also chairman and founding editor), Harvard Business Review, The Atlantic, The New York Times, and The Wall Street Journal.

Reich is a political commentator on programs including Erin Burnett OutFront, CNN Tonight, Anderson Cooper's AC360, Hardball with Chris Matthews, This Week with George Stephanopoulos, CNBC's Kudlow & Company, and APM's Marketplace. In 2008, Time magazine named him one of the Ten Best Cabinet Members of the century, and in the same year The Wall Street Journal placed him sixth on its list of Most Influential Business Thinkers.

He has published 18 books which have been translated into 22 languages, including the best-sellers The Work of Nations, Reason, Saving Capitalism, Supercapitalism, Aftershock: The Next Economy and America's Future, and a best-selling e-book, Beyond Outrage. He is also board chair emeritus of Common Cause and writes his own blog about the political economy at Robertreich.org. The Robert Reich–Jacob Kornbluth film Saving Capitalism was selected to be a Netflix Original, and debuted in November 2017, and their film Inequality for All won a U.S. Documentary Special Jury Award for Achievement in Filmmaking at the 2013 Sundance Film Festival in Utah.

In 2015, Reich and Kornbluth founded Inequality Media, a nonprofit digital media company. Inequality Media's videos feature Reich discussing topics relating to inequality and power primarily in the United States, including universal basic income, labor rights protection, the racial wealth gap, affordable housing, and gerrymandering.

Early life and career 
Reich was born to a Jewish family in Scranton, Pennsylvania, the son of Mildred Freshman (née Dorf) and Edwin Saul Reich (1914–2016), who owned a women's clothing store. As a child, he was diagnosed with multiple epiphyseal dysplasia, also known as Fairbank's disease, a bone disorder that results in short stature among other symptoms. This condition made him a target for bullies and he sought out the protection of older boys; one of them was Michael Schwerner, who was one of the three civil rights workers murdered in Mississippi by the Ku Klux Klan in 1964 for the registration of African-American voters. Reich cites this event as an inspiration to "fight the bullies, to protect the powerless, to make sure that the people without a voice have a voice".

He attended John Jay High School in Cross River, New York. Reich received a National Merit Scholarship and majored in history at Dartmouth College, graduating with an A.B., summa cum laude, in 1968 and winning a Rhodes Scholarship to study Philosophy, Politics, and Economics at University College, Oxford. While at Dartmouth, Reich went on a date with Hillary Rodham, the future Hillary Clinton, then an undergraduate at Wellesley College. While studying at Oxford, Reich first met Bill Clinton, also a Rhodes Scholar. Although he was drafted to serve in the Vietnam War, he did not pass the physical as he was under the required minimum height of five feet. Reich subsequently earned a J.D. from Yale Law School, where he was an editor of the Yale Law Journal. At Yale, he was classmates with Bill and Hillary Clinton, Clarence Thomas, Michael Medved, and Richard Blumenthal.

From 1973 to 1974, Reich served as a law clerk to Judge Frank M. Coffin, chief judge of the U.S. Court of Appeals for the First Circuit. From 1974 to 1976, he was an assistant to U.S. Solicitor General, Robert Bork, whom he had studied antitrust law under while at Yale. In 1977, President Jimmy Carter appointed him director of the Policy Planning Staff at the Federal Trade Commission. From 1980 until 1992, Reich taught at the John F. Kennedy School of Government at Harvard University, where he wrote a series of influential books and articles, including The Next American Frontier and The Work of Nations.

Tenure as Secretary of Labor 

Bill Clinton incorporated Reich's thinking into his 1992 campaign platform, and after Clinton won the election, he appointed Reich to head economic policy for the presidential transition.

Reich joined the administration as Secretary of Labor. On January 21, his nomination was confirmed unanimously and without controversy, along with a slate of Clinton appointees. 

In the very early days of the administration, Reich was seen as one of the most powerful members of the Clinton cabinet, both for his friendship with the President and his ambitious agenda for the Department of Labor. Whereas under 12 years of Republican presidencies the Department had largely been used as a patronage posting, Reich envisioned it as the nucleus of a "cluster" of agencies, including the departments of Commerce and Education, which could act in tandem to break down traditional bureaucratic barriers. Consistent with the 1992 Clinton platform and his writings before taking office, Reich called for more federal spending on jobs training and infrastructure.

Reich also took initiative to expand his flexible power as an economic advisor-at-large to the President. As a member of the National Economic Council, Reich advised Clinton on health care reform, education policy, welfare reform, national service initiatives, and technology policy, as well as deficit reduction and spending priorities. He also actively engaged independent government agencies, such as the Federal Communications Commission, to take a labor-focused approach to regulation. He referred to himself as "secretary of the American work force" and "the central banker of the nation's greatest resource." 

However, he butted heads with deficit hawks on the administration's economic team, including budget director Leon Panetta and Federal Reserve chair Alan Greenspan, a holdover from the Reagan administration whom Clinton reappointed. Reducing the deficit was soon the administration's top economic priority, placing Reich's economic agenda on hold. He later credited Hillary Clinton with keeping him apprised of goings-on within the White House.

During his tenure, he implemented the Family and Medical Leave Act (FMLA) and successfully lobbied to increase the national minimum wage.

NAFTA

Throughout his first year in office, Reich was a leading proponent of the North American Free Trade Agreement (NAFTA), which was negotiated by the George H. W. Bush administration and supported by Clinton following two side agreements negotiated to satisfy labor and environmental groups. Reich served as leading public and private spokesman for the Clinton administration against organized labor, who continued to oppose the Agreement as a whole.

In July 1993, Reich said that the unions were "just plain wrong" to suggest NAFTA would cause a loss of American employment and predicted that "given the pace of growth of the Mexican automobile market over the next 15 years, I would say that more automobile jobs would be created in the United States than would be lost to Mexico... [T]he American automobile industry will grow substantially, and the net effect will be an increase in automobile jobs." He further argued that trade liberalization following World War II had led to the "biggest increase in jobs and standard of living among the industrialized nations [in] history.
"

In a September 1993 to the Center for National Policy think tank, Reich said, "Great change demands great flexibility -- the capacity to adapt quickly and continuously, to change jobs, change directions, gain new skills. But the sad irony is that massive change on the scale we are now facing may be inviting the opposite reaction: a politics of preservation, grounded in fear." Reich specifically said opposition to NAFTA "has little to do with the agreement and much to do with the pervasive anxieties arising from economic changes that are already affecting Americans." In October, Reich addressed the biannual AFL-CIO convention in San Francisco, where Economic Policy Institute economist Thea Lea mocked Reich's view as a "field-of-dreams" theory of job creation. His remarks were generally well-received, though only briefly mentioning NAFTA; he focused on the Clinton administration's approach to the National Labor Relations Board and day-to-day business regulation and management-labor relations.

In advance of the final vote, Reich personally lobbied members of Congress to support the Agreement. The bill passed the House 234–200 on November 17 and the Senate 61–38 on November 20; President Clinton signed it in to law on December 8.

Over twenty years later, in opposing the Trans-Pacific Partnership as "NAFTA on steroids," Reich repudiated his position. He further admitted that he regretted "not doing more to strengthen [NAFTA]'s labor and environmental side-agreements," though he denied supporting an expedited "fast-track" legislative process without opportunity for amendment.

Return to influence (1995–1997)

By August 1994, Reich had largely been sidelined on policy by the deficit hawks in the administration. With the approval of the White House, he delivered the first of four major speeches on the emergence of a new "anxious class" of Americans concerned with increased global competition and technological change.

After a disastrous showing for the Democratic Party in the November 1994 midterm elections, Reich returned to the forefront of the Clinton economic team. Clinton reframed his agenda around a set of Reich proposals: middle-class tax cuts, a boost in the minimum wage, tax deductions for college tuition, federal grants to help workers upgrade their skills, and a ban on strike replacements.

In a speech to the Democratic Leadership Council shortly after the election, Reich called for cutting corporate subsidies, which he labeled "corporate welfare," as the only possible means to afford  jobs training programs. In a concession to the new Republican congress, Reich said that many federal job training programs did not work and that there was a need to consolidate programs that work and eliminate those that did not. After the speech, Treasury Secretary Lloyd Bentsen and Commerce Secretary Ron Brown attempted to distance the administration from Reich's corporate welfare comments. However, Bentsen soon resigned; Reich continued to attack corporate welfare.

In February 1995, Reich met opposition within the administration over his proposal to ban government contractors from permanently replacing striking workers. Clinton sided with Reich, re-establishing his central role in the administration's economic policy. 

Reich gave weekly speeches attacking the new Republican majority, with his central message being the need to adapt to an "information-based" economy and the continued need for job re-training. He said, "We can't get the mass production economy back. The challenge now is of a different kind, and many have found it difficult to adapt. This is a major social transformation." On a Chicago call-in radio show, he said, "You are on a downward escalator. You have a lot of job insecurity because of the tidal wave of corporate downsizing and restructuring."

In December 1995, Reich delivered a commencement speech at the University of Maryland, College Park, in which he decried the increasing tendency of wealthy, educated Americans to divide themselves from the general population as "the secession of the successful America."

Resignation and memoir
In 1996, between Clinton's re-election and second inauguration, Reich decided to leave the department to spend more time with his sons, then in their teen years. 

By April 1997, he published his experiences working for the Clinton administration in Locked in the Cabinet. Among those he criticized in the tell-all were Clinton advisor Dick Morris, former AFL-CIO head Lane Kirkland, and Federal Reserve Board chairman Alan Greenspan, a leading deficit hawk whom he considered "the most powerful man in the world." In the book, Reich criticizes the Democratic Party as "owned by" business and Washington as having two real political parties during his tenure: the "Save the Jobs" party, which wanted to maintain the status quo, and the "Let 'Em Drown" party.

After publication of the book, Reich received criticism for embellishing events with invented dialogue which did not match C-SPAN tapes or official transcripts of meetings. The paperback release of the memoir revised or omitted the inventions. In one story, members of the National Association of Manufacturers (NAM) confronted Reich with curses and shouts of "Go back to Harvard!" In the revised version of the NAM story, Reich is instead hissed at.  The foreword to the paperback contained an explanation, in which Reich says that "memory is fallible." 

The memoir has since been called "a classic of the pissed-off-secretary genre" by Glenn Thrush.

After the Clinton administration 
Reich became a professor at Brandeis University, teaching courses for undergraduates as well as in the Heller School for Social Policy and Management. In 2003, he was elected the Professor of the Year by the undergraduate student body.

On January 1, 2006, Reich joined the faculty of UC Berkeley's Goldman School of Public Policy. Since then, he has taught a popular undergraduate course called Wealth and Poverty, in addition to his graduate courses. Reich is also a member of the board of trustees for the Blum Center for Developing Economies at the University of California, Berkeley. The center is focused on finding solutions to address the crisis of extreme poverty and disease in the developing world. In February 2017, Reich criticized UC Berkeley's decision to host Donald Trump supporter Milo Yiannopoulos. Following protests on the Berkeley Campus Reich stated that although he didn't "want to add to the conspiratorial musings" he wouldn't rule out the possibility the "agitators" were a right-wing false flag for Trump to strip universities of federal funding.

2002 campaign for Governor of Massachusetts

In 2002, he ran for Governor of Massachusetts, losing in the Democratic primary to Shannon O'Brien. He also published an associated campaign book, I'll Be Short. Reich was the first US gubernatorial candidate to support same-sex marriage. He also pledged support for abortion rights and strongly condemned capital punishment. His campaign staff was largely made up of his Brandeis students. Although his campaign had little funding, he narrowly came in second out of six candidates in the Democratic primary with 25% of the vote; O'Brien went on to lose the general election to Republican future two-time presidential candidate and U.S. Senator Mitt Romney.

In early 2005, there was speculation that Reich would once again seek the Democratic nomination for Governor of Massachusetts. He instead endorsed the then-little-known candidacy of Deval Patrick, who had previously served as Assistant Attorney General for Civil Rights in the Clinton Administration. Patrick won the party's endorsement, a three-way primary with nearly 50% of the vote, and the general election in November 2006.

Political commentary

In 2004, Reich published Reason: Why Liberals Will Win the Battle for America.

In addition to his professorial role, he was a weekly contributor to the American Public Media public radio program Marketplace, and a regular columnist for The American Prospect, which he co-founded in 1990. He has also frequently contributed to CNBC's Kudlow & Company and On the Money.

In 2010, his weekly column was syndicated by Tribune Content Agency. Since at least summer 2016, Reich has contributed an opinion column to Newsweek. 

In 2013, he teamed up with filmmaker Jacob Kornbluth to produce the documentary Inequality for All, based on his book Aftershock which won a Special Jury Award at the Sundance Film Festival. In 2017, he again teamed up with Jacob Kornbluth to produce the documentary Saving Capitalism, based on his book of that name. Netflix chose the film to be a Netflix Original Documentary. In the documentary, Reich posits that large corporations began in the late 1960s to use financial power to purchase influence among the political class and consolidate political power, highlighting in particular the influence of the 2010 Citizens United ruling that allowed corporations to contribute to election campaigns. In the documentary, he advocates for grassroots political mobilization among working class Americans to countervail the political power of corporate America.

In 2022, Reich was featured in The Simpsons season finale "Poorhouse Rock," where he briefly explains the economic decline of the American middle class during a musical sequence.

Political stances 

In an interview with The New York Times, Reich explained that "I don't believe in redistribution of wealth for the sake of redistributing wealth. But I am concerned about how we can afford to pay for what we as a nation need to do [...] [Taxes should pay] for what we need in order to be safe and productive. As Oliver Wendell Holmes once wrote, 'taxes are the price we pay for a civilized society.

In response to a question as to what to recommend to the incoming president regarding a fair and sustainable income and wealth distribution, Reich said: "Expand the Earned Income Tax Credit—a wage supplement for lower-income people, and finance it with a higher marginal income tax on the top five percent. For the longer term, invest in education for lower income communities, starting with early-childhood education and extending all the way up to better access to post-secondary education."

Reich is pro-union, saying: "Unionization is not just good for workers in unions, unionization is very, very important for the economy overall, and would create broad benefits for the United States." He also favors raising the federal minimum wage to $15/hr across three years, believing that it will not adversely impact big business, and will increase higher value worker availability.

Reich also supports an unconditional and universal basic income. On the eve of a June 2016 popular vote in Switzerland on basic income, he declared that countries will have to introduce this instrument sooner or later.

While affordable housing has been a central issue in Reich's activism, in July 2020 Reich opposed a high-density development project in his own neighborhood in Berkeley. He supported making a 120-year-old triplex a landmark to prevent the construction of a 10-apartment building, one of which would be deed restricted to be rented to a low income tenant, citing "the character of the neighborhood". During an interview with W. Kamau Bell the following month, Reich reaffirmed his support for affordable housing "in every community I've been involved in," and critiqued the development for replacing the house with "condos selling for one and a half million dollars each."

Although a supporter of Israel, Reich has criticized Israel's settlement building in the occupied Palestinian territories.

In September 2005 Reich testified against John Roberts at his confirmation hearings for Chief Justice of the United States Supreme Court.

On April 18, 2008, Reich endorsed Barack Obama for President of the United States. During the 2008 primaries, Reich published an article that was critical of the Clintons, referring to Bill Clinton's attacks on Barack Obama as "ill-tempered and ill-founded", and accusing the Clintons of waging "a smear campaign against Obama that employs some of the worst aspects of the old politics".

Reich endorsed Bernie Sanders for President of the United States in 2016 and 2020. After Sanders ended his 2016 campaign, Reich urged Sanders's supporters to back eventual Democratic nominee Hillary Clinton. 

On May 31, 2020, Reich declared that "by having no constructive response to any of the monumental crises now convulsing America, Trump has abdicated his office." Since at least 2021, Reich has publicly supported President Donald Trump's removal from Twitter and other social media platforms. In an April 2022 op-ed published on The Guardian, he criticized Elon Musk's efforts to take over Twitter, opining that the "libertarian vision of an 'uncontrolled' internet" is "dangerous rubbish".

In 2022, Reich called Florida Governor Ron DeSantis a "fascist".

Social media 

In 2013, with Jacob Kornbluth, Reich founded Inequality Media, which produces videos, live interviews on Facebook, portions of his undergraduate class at Berkeley, and long-form videos. The purpose is to educate the public about the implications of the widening inequalities of income, wealth, and political power. Reich and Kornbluth have produced more than 90 videos of two minutes each about the economy and current events, that have been watched by more than 50 million people.

Since shortly after the 2017 inauguration Reich has produced a "Resistance Report" program, offering contextual analysis of latest White House and Cabinet activities, typically a 15- to 30-minute presentation, available on social media sites such as Facebook and YouTube.

In late January 2020, Reich and Inequality Media launched a new YouTube weekly talk show called The Common Good.

Personal life 
Reich married British-born lawyer Clare Dalton in Cambridge, UK, in 1973; they divorced in 2012. During their marriage, the couple had two sons: Sam, an American producer, director, writer, actor, and performer; and Adam, a sociology professor at Columbia University. Reich was subsequently married to photographer Perian Flaherty.

In 2020, the City of Berkeley Landmarks Preservation Commission published letters that he had written to them regarding his objection to the proposed demolition of Payson House at 1915 Berryman in Berkeley, CA, near Reich's home.

Awards 
 Bruno-Kreisky Award, best political book of year (Supercapitalism), 2009
  Václav Havel Foundation VIZE 97 Prize, October 2003, for his writings in economics and politics.
 Louis Brownlow Award (best book on public administration), National Academy of Public Administration, 1984

Written works

Books 

 1982: Minding America's Business: The Decline and Rise of the American Economy (with Ira Magaziner), 
 1983: The Next American Frontier, 
 1985: New Deals: The Chrysler Revival and the American System (with writer John Donahue), 
 1987: Tales of a New America: The Anxious Liberal's Guide to the Future, 
 1989: The Resurgent Liberal: And Other Unfashionable Prophecies, 
 1990: The Power of Public Ideas (editor), 
 1990: Public Management in a Democratic Society, 
 1991: The Work of Nations: Preparing Ourselves for 21st Century Capitalism, 
 1997: Locked in the Cabinet, 
 2000: The Future of Success: Working and Living in the New Economy, 
 2002: I'll Be Short: Essentials for a Decent Working Society, 
 2004: Reason: Why Liberals Will Win the Battle for America, 
 2007: Supercapitalism: The Transformation of Business, Democracy, and Everyday Life, 
 2010: Aftershock: The Next Economy and America's Future,  (updated edition 2013)
 2012: Beyond Outrage: What Has Gone Wrong with Our Economy and Our Democracy, and How to Fix It, 
 2015: Saving Capitalism: For the Many, Not the Few, 
 2017: Economics in Wonderland, 
 2018: The Common Good, 
 2020: The System: Who Rigged It, How We Fix It,

Plays 

 Milton and Augusto (reading, University of California Berkeley, Center for Latin American Studies, September 2013)
 Public Exposure (East Coast premier, Wellfleet Harbor Actor's Theater, June 2005; West Coast premier, Santa Rosa Theater, June 2008)

Filmography 

These documentaries, and additional social media movies, have been made in collaboration with Jacob Kornbluth.

 2013: Inequality for All
 2017: Saving Capitalism

See also 

 2008–09 Keynesian resurgence
 Journal of Women, Politics & Policy – Reich sits on the editorial board
 The Trap (TV series), BBC documentary featuring Reich

References

External links 

 
 The Guardian contributor page
 From the Left, blog by Reich
 
 The American Prospect articles by Robert Reich
 UC Berkeley bio
  on the Fediverse

1946 births
20th-century American economists
20th-century American male writers
20th-century American philosophers
20th-century American politicians
20th-century essayists
21st-century American economists
21st-century American male writers
21st-century American philosophers
21st-century American politicians
21st-century essayists
Alumni of the University of Oxford
Alumni of University College, Oxford
American bloggers
American economics writers
American male essayists
American male non-fiction writers
American political writers
American podcasters
American Rhodes Scholars
American social commentators
American social democrats
Analytic philosophers
Brandeis University faculty
Carnegie Council for Ethics in International Affairs
Clinton administration cabinet members
Dartmouth College alumni
Economic Policy Institute
Economists from New York (state)
Economists from Pennsylvania
Goldman School of Public Policy faculty
Harvard University faculty
HuffPost bloggers
Jewish American members of the Cabinet of the United States
Jewish philosophers
John Jay High School (Cross River, New York) alumni
American LGBT rights activists
Living people
Massachusetts Democrats
People from Lewisboro, New York
Philosophers of culture
Philosophers of economics
Philosophers of history
Philosophers of social science
Philosophy writers
Political philosophers
Politicians from Scranton, Pennsylvania
Social philosophers
Theorists on Western civilization
United States Secretaries of Labor
Writers about activism and social change
Writers about globalization
Writers from Scranton, Pennsylvania
Yale Law School alumni